Markopoulo Mesogaias is a suburban town and a municipality in East Attica, Greece.

Geography

The municipality Markopoulo Mesogaias is situated in the Mesogaia plain, in the eastern part of the Attica peninsula, and touches the Aegean Sea coast in the east, where the port town Porto Rafti is located. The town Markopoulo is in the western part of the municipality, at about  elevation. Greek National Road 89 (Gerakas - Koropi - Lavrio - Sounio) passes through Markopoulo. Markopoulo had a railway station on the Athens–Lavrion Railway, which closed for passenger traffic in 1957.

Settlements

Agía Triáda (2011 census pop. 218)
Vravróna, ancient Brauron (pop. 195) - located in the northeast by the Aegean Sea
Chamoliá (pop. 185)
Koulidás (pop. 243)
Markópoulo (pop. 9,513) - the municipal seat
Poriá (pop. 0)
Porto Rafti or Limín Markopoúlou (pop. 9,686)

Historical monuments 

 The church of Saint Paraskevi, in 1741 (Markopoulo-Mesogeia). A wall painting monument (1741) of George Markou the Argus, the great and prolific post-Byzantine ecclesiastic iconographer of the 18th century ("....La Santa Parascevi (inizio della sua agiografia1741׃ ,(che si trova al paesimo di Marcopulo, dell 'Attica...." Evangelos Andreou http://ketlib.lib.unipi.gr/xmlui/handle/ket/849)
 The church of Saint Thecla. A wall painting monument (18th century) of "Georgios Markou the Argeius" iconographers school  http://www.biblionet.gr/book/178713/Ανδρέου,_Ευάγγελος/Γεώργιος_Μάρκου_ο_Αργείος
 The Temple of Artemis in Brauron

Sports
Markopoulo was the home to two venues of the 2004 Summer Olympics: the Markopoulo Olympic Equestrian Centre  and the Markopoulo Olympic Shooting Centre.

Markopoulo's women volleyball team plays in the A1 Ethniki Women's Volleyball, the highest level national competition.

Economy
Historically, the economy of the region has been largely agricultural, with grapes and wine being the major components of the local economy until today. The Merenda quarry also allowed for a major economic expansion during the 1990s, however operations have ceased since 2014. Today, tourism is a major driver as the nearby seaside town, Porto Rafti, is a very popular tourist destination in Attica.

Multiple companies, including SkyGreece Airlines have had their corporate headquarters in Markopoulo Mesogaias due to the easy access to Athens International Airport.

Historical population

See also
List of municipalities of Attica

References

External links
Markopoulo Official Site

Populated places in East Attica
Municipalities of Attica
Arvanite settlements